Juan Fernando Ortega (born March 2, 1957) is a singer-songwriter in contemporary Christian music. He is noted both for his interpretations of many traditional hymns and songs, such as "Give Me Jesus",  "Be Thou My Vision" and "Praise to the Lord, the Almighty", and for writing clear and easily understood songs such as "This Good Day".

Biography
Ortega was born and raised in Albuquerque, New Mexico, near the banks of the Rio Grande. He started learning piano at eight years of age. Through his father's work with the United States Department of State, he also spent time in Ecuador and Barbados. His family lived in Chimayó, New Mexico, for eight generations, a legacy cited as an influence on his music.

Ortega graduated from Valley High School and the University of New Mexico, where he received his bachelor's degree in music education.

It is from his heritage and classical training at the University of New Mexico that Ortega derives his sound, embracing country, classical, Celtic, Latin American, world, modern folk and rustic hymnody.

Discography
 In a Welcome Field (1991/2000)
 Hymns and Meditations (1994)
 This Bright Hour (1997)
 The Breaking of the Dawn (1998)
 Give Me Jesus – EP (1999)
 Home (2000)
 Camino Largo (2001)
 Storm (2002)
 Night of Your Return (2002)
 Hymns of Worship (2003)
 Fernando Ortega (2004)
 Live In St. Paul – DVD (2004)
 Beginnings (2005)
 The Shadow of Your Wings: Hymns and Sacred Songs (2006)
 Christmas Songs (2008)
 Meditations of the Heart – piano solos (2011)
 Meditations of the Heart: Encore – piano solos (2011)
 Come Down O Love Divine  (2011)
 Best Of – Live In St. Paul – CD (2015)
 The Crucifixion Of Jesus (2017)
 Other appearances include:
Calvary Chapel Music Praise, Vol. 1 ("How I Love You Lord" and "Teach Me Your Ways")
Calvary Chapel Worship Alive, Vol. 1 ("I Will Delight" and "Lord, Listen to Your Children Praying")
Next Door Savior ("How Deep the Father's Love For Us")
The Making of a Godly Man ("Jehová, Señor De Los Cielos" and "Jesus, You Are My Life") (1997)
The Odes Project ("Sing Allelu" and "I Stretched Out My Hands")
Unknown Albums: "I Will Sing the Wondrous Story" and "O For a Thousand Tongues to Sing"

Charts
Storm reached No. 197 on the Billboard 200 in 2002.

Christmas Songs reached No. 36 on the Billboard Christmas Album Chart in 2009.

Awards
Dove Awards

1998
Bluegrass Song: "Children of the Living God"
2000
Inspirational Album: Home
2002
Special Event Album of the Year: City on a Hill (various artists)

Gallery

References

External links
Official Site

1957 births
American gospel singers
Christian music songwriters
American male singers
Living people